Galeichthys peruvianus is a species of sea catfish that is found in the Pacific Ocean off the coast of Peru and far northern Chile. They reach a length of 35 cm. They are a component of commercial fisheries for human consumption. As with many species in this family, the dorsal fin spines are venomous and any wounds inflicted by them warrant prompt treatment.

References
 

Ariidae
Catfish of South America
Western South American coastal fauna
Fish of Peru
Fish described in 1874